The 1982 United States Senate election in Washington was held on November 2, 1982. Incumbent Democrat Henry M. Jackson defeated Republican nominee Douglas Jewett with 68.96% of the vote.

Primary election
Primary elections were held on September 14, 1982.

Candidates 
Henry M. Jackson, incumbent United States Senator
Douglas Jewett, Seattle City Attorney
King Lysen, State Senator
Jesse Chiang
Larry Penberthy
Ken Talbott
Patrick Sean McGowan
C.E. Stites
James Sherwood Stokes
William H. Davis
John Patric, writer
Arthur Bauder
Clarice Privette
Chris Remple

Results

General election

Candidates
Major party candidates
Henry M. Jackson, Democratic
Douglas Jewett, Republican

Other candidates
King Lysen, Independent
Jesse Chiang, Independent

Results

See also 
 1982 United States Senate elections

References 

1982
Washington
United States Senate